Jemma or Jama'are is a town in Bauchi State, Nigeria.

Geography
Jemma sits 30 km straight west of Azare and 65 km east of Dutse, on the west bank of the Bunga River.  20 km south of Jemma along the river lies the town of Disina.  The town has an estimated population of 15,352.

Jemma Sarmiento

References

Populated places in Bauchi State